Dima Kash (born November 18, 1989) is a Russian-born singer-songwriter and rapper based in Twin Cities, Minnesota.

Career
Kash was born on November 18, 1989, in Rîbnița, Moldova, to Russian parents who immigrated to the United States as a war refugee from the USSR. He attended Burnsville High School in Burnsville, MN but dropped out at the age of 16. Later, he joined army where he was discharged on medical grounds after sustaining injuries to his back.

Dima Kash started recording music at the age of 17 at his own recording studio. In 2013, he released his first album Vibe with me. He has worked and toured to many parts of the United States with Grammy Award winner Layzie Bone from Bone Thugs-n-Harmony. In 2014, he collaborated with Royce Rizzy and toured in Japan. Dima Kash has also performed on a showcase at the SXSW Music Festival in Austin, Texas, in 2015 alongside Twista, Crucial Conflict, Lil Durk, Dreezy, Murphy Lee and many others.

In 2015, Dima Kash collaborated with Mod Sun and released his second album Kash Over Everything. The song from the album  Can't Breathe was listed in Spotify's Viral Global 50 Charts alongside artists like Drake, Rihanna and Adele. The song was also listed at No. 27 on US chart and No. 47 on UK chart.<ref>[http://www.spotontrack.com/track/can-t-breathe-original/62724#tab-peak Global Peak Positions "Can't Breathe]. Retrieved December 17, 2016</ref> Dima Kash has worked with numerous artists including 2 Chainz, T.I., Lil Boosie, G-Eazy, MGK, Kid Ink, Bone Thugs N Harmony and Twista. He was awarded with the Rap Artist of the Year'' award at 2016 TCUMA awards.

References

External links
Official Website

1989 births
Musicians from Minnesota
Living people
Russian musicians
People from Rîbnița